Amir Hossein Tahuni (born 22 October 1992 in Iran) is an Iranian football midfielder, who currently plays for Shahrdari Mahshahr in League 2.

Club career

Club Career Statistics
Last Update: 23 April 2015

References

Living people
1992 births
Iranian footballers
Esteghlal F.C. players
Nassaji Mazandaran players
Association football midfielders